Dinotopterus cunningtoni is a species of catfish in the family Clariidae. It is endemic to Lake Tanganyika in Burundi, the Democratic Republic of the Congo, Tanzania, and Zambia. It is of importance in local commercial fisheries.

The genus Dinotopterus is currently considered monotypic, but formerly included several Lake Malawi species that now are placed in Bathyclarias.

References

 
Catfish genera
Fish of Lake Tanganyika
Fish described in 1906
Taxa named by George Albert Boulenger
Monotypic freshwater fish genera
Taxonomy articles created by Polbot